Assemini is a comune (municipality) in the Metropolitan City of Cagliari in the Italian region Sardinia, located about  northwest of Cagliari in the plain of the Cixerri, Flumini Mannu and Sa Nuxedda rivers. It includes notable forest area which are part of the Sulcis Regional Park. It has also a long tradition in the production of ceramics, lasting from the Carthaginian domination. 

Assemini is part of the Cagliari metropolitan area and borders the following municipalities: Cagliari, Capoterra, Decimomannu, Elmas, Nuxis, San Sperate, Santadi, Sarroch, Sestu, Siliqua, Uta, Villa San Pietro.

Main sights 

 Historical Campidano-type houses.
 Church of St. Peter, dating from 11th century but mostly rebuilt in Gothic style under the Aragonese domination in the 16th century. The square façade and the lower part of the bell tower are from the 18th century. The interior has a nave with side chapels in Gothic style.
 Pre-Romanesque Church and Oratory of St. John (San Giovanni, 9th-10th century). It is unusual for its cross plan enclosed within a square, surmounted by a dome, while the arms of the cross are barrel-vaulted. The façade is in limestone.

See also
Cagliari metropolitan area

References

External links 

 

Cities and towns in Sardinia
Articles which contain graphical timelines